Macfadden Communications Group is a publisher of business magazines. It has a historical link with a company started in 1898 by Bernarr Macfadden that was one of the largest magazine publishers of the twentieth century.

History

Macfadden Publications 
Physical Culture, Bernarr Macfadden's first magazine, was based on Macfadden's interest in bodybuilding. The launch of True Story in 1919 made the company very successful. Other well-known magazines, such as Photoplay and True Detective, soon followed. Macfadden also launched the tabloid New York Evening Graphic. Bernarr Macfadden withdrew from his leadership roles with the company in 1941.

Macfadden/Bartell 
In 1961, the Bartell Broadcasting Corporation bought a controlling share in Macfadden and merged with the company, forming Macfadden/Bartell. Bartell owned WADO New York, WOKY Milwaukee, and KCBQ San Diego. A share in Bartell was acquired by Downe Communications in 1967, with full control in 1969. Between 1969 and 1974 Downe was acquired by Charter Company. Bartell was fully acquired by Downe in 1976, and Downe was fully acquired by Charter in 1978.  

Downe purchased the newspaper supplement Family Weekly in 1966, and the Ladies' Home Journal and The American Home from the Curtis Publishing Company in 1968.

Macfadden Group 
Macfadden's women's magazines were spun off in 1975, and sold to the unit president, Peter J. Callahan. These magazines were:
 True Story
 Photoplay
 TV-Radio Mirror
 True Confessions
 Motion Picture
 True Romance
 True Experience
 True Love

Us was purchased in 1980, and sold in 1986. In the mid-eighties, Macfadden bought the Ideal Publishing Company, which published Teen Beat and other fan magazines, from Filmways. MacFadden acquired a stake in what would become American Media in 1989 when it bought a stake in the National Enquirer.

Sterling/Macfadden 
In 1991, the Macfadden consumer magazines were spun off and merged with Sterling's Magazines. Sterling's published fan magazines such as Tiger Beat, as well as the music magazine Metal Edge. The merger was finalized in October 1992. In 1998, the conglomerate's line of youth music publications was sold off to Primedia; the rest were bought by Dorchester Media in 2004.

Teen Magazines 
Right On! 
Teen Beat
16 Magazine
Tiger Beat
Teen

Macfadden Holdings 
The trade magazines Chief Executive and Discount Merchandiser, as well as the company's stake in American Media, remained a separate company. American Media was sold in 1999 to the investment group Evercore Partners. The Macfadden trade titles were sold to VNU the same year.

Present day 
The executives of Macfadden Business Communications started a new company using the Macfadden name. It is a publisher of business-to-business magazines.

Historical publications

Magazines  

Physical Culture
True Story (1919–2004)
Brain Power (1922–24) (also titled National Pictorial Brain Power Magazine)
True Experiences (1922-
True Romances (1923-
Love and Romance (1923-
Muscle Builder (1924-
True Detective (1924–1971)
Master Detective (1930-
Famous Detective Cases
True Love
True Love Stories (1924-
True Marriage Stories (1924-
Modern Marriage
Own Your Own Home
Your Faith
Your Home
Dream World (also titled Dream World: Love and Romance)
Ghost Stories (1926–32) (under Harold Hersey's control 1930-32)
Macfadden's Fiction Lovers' Magazine
Midnight (also titled Midnight Mysteries)
The Dance Magazine
Climax: Exciting Stories for Men
Photoplay (1934–1980)
Secrets (1936-
Personal Romances (1937-
Movie Mirror
Radio Mirror (  -1948)
Saga: Adventure Stories for Men (195x-198x)
TV Radio Mirror (1949–1977)
True Confessions (1963–1992)
Motion Picture (1911–1977)
Sport (1946–1975)
Intimate Stories (1948-
Revealing Romances (1949-
Pageant (1961–1977)
Liberty (1931–1950)
Home Furnishings News (2006-2014) also known as HFN
Dance Magazine (2001-2016)
Dance Spirit (2006-2016)
Dance Teacher (2006-2016)
Pointe (2006-2016)
Dance Retailer News (2006-2016)
Grocery Headquarters (2004-2017)

Newspapers 
New York Graphic (1924–1932)
Philadelphia Daily News (1925–1932)
Detroit Daily
Detroit Mirror (? – 1931)

Teck Publishing Corporation (1931–1938) 
Amazing Stories
Radio News
Wild West Stories & Complete Novel Magazine

Bartholomew House imprint 
Macfadden also published a few hardcover books through the years, under the imprint Bartholomew House. Initially a way to group together stories from Macfadden's magazines into a book (as in Great Western Heroes, Great Pioneer Heroes),  the imprint expanded into first editions of new material after the purchase by the Bartell Group (Coffee, Tea or Me?, "Say ... Didn’t You Used to Be George Murphy?").

 1950 - Magic Cook Book: The Key to Kitchen Economy, prepared by the Food Editors of True Story Magazine
 1957 - Great Western Heroes: Six True Stories of the Men Who Tamed the West, edited by Rafer Brent
 1958 - Great Pioneer Heroes: True Stories of the Men Who Made America, edited by Rafer Brent
 1966 - Ecstasy and Me: My Life as a Woman by Hedy Lamarr (ghostwritten by Leo Guild and Cy Rice)
 1967 - Coffee, Tea or Me?: The Uninhibited Memoirs of Two Airline Stewardesses by Trudy Baker and Rachel Jones (ghostwritten by Donald Bain)
 1968 - The CanniBal$: a Novel About Television's Savage Chieftains by Keefe Brasselle
 1969 - Mannequin: My Life as a Model by Carolyn Kenmore (ghostwritten by William Dufty)
 1970 - "Say ... Didn’t You Used to Be George Murphy?" by George Murphy (with Victor Lasky)

Current publications
Pet Business (purchased  in 2000)

References

External links
 
The True Story of Bernarr Macfadden

Magazine publishing companies of the United States
Privately held companies based in New York (state)
Companies based in New York City
Publishing companies established in 1898